Merytawy Penamun was an ancient Egyptian pharaoh whose datation is extremely uncertain.

Identification
Penamun does not appear on any king list and his damaged cartouche was only found on a stone block from Kom Abu Billo (ancient Terenuthis) in the western Nile Delta.

According to Jürgen von Beckerath, Penamun should have been a local Delta ruler during the 25th Dynasty (744–656 BC) who adopted the royal titulary; von Beckerath argues that he put his praenomen and nomen within the same cartouche, and that the lost portion on it could have contained the hieroglyph for "Re" (N5 in Gardiner's sign list) i.e. the standard suffix for pharaonic praenomina, thus becoming a Merytawyre.

Basing on orthographic grounds, Kenneth Kitchen rather opts for a later dating for Penamun, believing that he should have ruled during the Persian period (started with the 27th Dynasty, 525–404 BC) or perhaps even later.

References

8th-century BC Pharaohs
7th-century BC Pharaohs
Non-dynastic pharaohs
People of the Twenty-fifth Dynasty of Egypt
Third Intermediate Period of Egypt
Late Period of ancient Egypt